Daviesia anceps is a species of flowering plant in the family Fabaceae and is endemic to the south of Western Australia. It is a dense, erect or low-lying shrub with its branchlets reduced to flattened cladodes, and yellow flowers with red markings.

Description

Taxonomy and naming
Daviesia anceps was first formally described in 1853 by Nikolai Turczaninow in the Bulletin de la Société Impériale des Naturalistes de Moscou. The specific epithet (anceps) means "flattened".

Distribution and habitat
This species of pea mainly grows in mallee and heathland around Ravensthorpe and in the Fitzgerald River National Park.

Conservation status
Daviesia anceps is classified as "not threatened" by the Government of Western Australia Department of Biodiversity, Conservation and Attractions.

References

anceps
Eudicots of Western Australia
Plants described in 1853
Taxa named by Nikolai Turczaninow